The men's competition in the middleweight (– 77 kg) division was held on 22 and 23 September 2010.

Schedule

Medalists

Records

Results

References
Pages 34–35 

- Mens 77 kg, 2010 World Weightlifting Championships